Li Jinjun (born May 1956) is a Chinese diplomat who has served as Chinese Ambassador to Myanmar, the Philippines, and North Korea.

Life and career
Li was born and raised in Jiangyin, Jiangsu. He entered Shanghai International Studies University in September 1972, majoring in German language, where he graduated in March 1974. Then he was accepted to the University of Heidelberg and graduated in April 1976. After graduation, he returned to China and that year he was assigned to the International Liaison Department of the Chinese Communist Party.

He was Deputy Communist Party Secretary of Huantai County from September 1993 to October 1994.

In January 2001 he was promoted to become the Chinese Ambassador to Burma, a position he held until December 2005, when he was transferred to the Philippines and appointed the Chinese Ambassador.

He became the Deputy Head of the International Liaison Department of the CCP in March 2007, he remained in that position until March 2015,  when he was appointed the Chinese Ambassador to North Korea. He was the longest-serving Chinese ambassador to North Korea; his tour in Pyongyang ended in 2021, with his departure from North Korea delayed by the COVID-19 pandemic. He was replaced by Wang Yajun.

References

1956 births
Chinese Communist Party politicians from Jiangsu
People's Republic of China politicians from Jiangsu
Living people
Shanghai International Studies University alumni
Heidelberg University alumni
Ambassadors of China to North Korea
Ambassadors of China to the Philippines
Ambassadors of China to Myanmar
Politicians from Wuxi
Diplomats of the People's Republic of China